Wendy Ayres-Bennett is a British linguist, Professor of French Philology and Linguistics at the University of Cambridge, England, and Professorial Fellow in Linguistics at Murray Edwards College.

She has a BA and MA in Modern Languages (French and German) from Girton College and a D.Phil. from the University of Oxford. Her doctoral thesis was "Vaugelas and the development of the French language: theory and practice". After her doctorate she spent a year as a Junior Research Fellow at St Hilda's College, Oxford and was appointed as an Assistant Lecturer (1983-1988), then Lecturer (1988-1998) and Reader (1998-2005), in the French Department at Cambridge.  She became a Fellow of Murray Edwards College (formerly New Hall) in 2001, and was appointed Professor of French Philology and Linguistics in 2005. In 2009 she joined the Department of Theoretical and Applied Linguistics.

Her main research interests are the history of the French language and the history of linguistic thought. Her research interests include standardisation and codification, linguistic ideology and policy, variation and change. She is  Principal Investigator on the multi-disciplinary multi-institution MEITS project: Multilingualism: Empowering Individuals, Transforming Societies., funded by the AHRC under its Open World Research Initiative (2016-2020). The project is working closely with policymakers and practitioners to promote the value of languages for key issues of our time and the benefits of language learning for individuals and societies.

In 2004 she was appointed as Officier dans l’Ordre des Palmes Académiques. The Académie française awarded her a Prix d’Académie in 1997 for her "Remarques de l’Académie française sur le Quinte-Curce de Vaugelas" and a silver medal of the Prix Georges Dumézil in 2013 for "Remarques et observations sur la langue française. Histoire et évolution d’un genre".

Selected publications
Vaugelas and the Development of the French Language (1987,) 
A History of the French Language through Texts (1996,) 
Les Remarques de l’Académie Française sur le Quinte-Curce de Vaugelas 1719-1720: contribution à une histoire de la norme grammaticale & rhétorique en France  (1996, co-authored with Philippe Caron; Presses de l’Ecole normale supérieure) 
Interpreting the History of French. A Festschrift for Peter Rickard on the occasion of his eightieth birthday (2002, co-edited  with Rodney Sampson Rodopi) 
Problems and Perspectives: Studies in the Modern French Language (2000, co-authored with Janice Carruthers,)
Sociolinguistic Variation in Seventeenth-century France: Methodology and Case Studies (2004,)
The French Language and Questions of Identity (2007, co-edited with Mari C. Jones,)
Remarques et observations sur la langue française : histoire et évolution d’un genre (2011, co-authored with Magali Seijido;) 
Bon Usage et variation sociolinguistique: Perspectives diachroniques et traditions nationales, (2013, Co-edited with Magali Seijido: ENS Éditions) 
L’Histoire du français : État des lieux et perspectives (2014, co-edited with Thomas Rainsford;)
Manual of Romance Sociolinguistics (2018, co-edited with Janice Carruthers, Berlin/Boston: Walter de Gruyter)
Claude Favre de Vaugelas, Remarques sur la langue française (2018), Paris: Editions Classiques Garnier)

References

External links

Year of birth missing (living people)
Living people
British women academics
Alumni of Girton College, Cambridge
Alumni of the University of Oxford
Fellows of Murray Edwards College, Cambridge
Academics of the University of Cambridge
Women linguists
Historical linguists
Linguists of French
Romance philologists
Officiers of the Ordre des Palmes Académiques
Linguists from the United Kingdom